Blanchard is a census-designated place and unincorporated community in Atchison County, Missouri, United States. As of the 2020 census, its population was 27. The community is located on the Iowa border and is adjacent to the city of Blanchard, Iowa. It has sometimes been known as "South Blanchard".

Demographics

References

Census-designated places in Missouri
Unincorporated communities in Atchison County, Missouri
Unincorporated communities in Missouri
Census-designated places in Atchison County, Missouri